The black-throated euphonia is a bird in the Fringillidae, or finch family.  It is known only by a single specimen in the British Natural History Museum with the type locality given as Rio de Janeiro, and was originally described as Euphonia vittata by Philip Sclater in 1861.  It is now thought to be an intrageneric hybrid between the chestnut-bellied euphonia (Euphonia pectoralis) and the orange-bellied euphonia (Euphonia xanthogaster).

References

Notes

Sources
 
 

Euphonia
Bird hybrids
Birds of Brazil
Controversial bird taxa
Taxa named by Philip Sclater